Cheryl Feldman Halpern was the chair of the Corporation for Public Broadcasting (CPB) from 2005 to 2007. She has extensive experience with overseeing pro-American media campaigns abroad.  In 1990, she was confirmed as a member of the Board for International Broadcasting and as a director of Radio Free Europe/Radio Liberty (RFE/RL). From 1995 through 2002, she served as a member of the Broadcasting Board of Governors, which oversees non-military overseas broadcasts by the US Government such as Radio Martí, the Voice of America, and Radio Free Iraq.

Halpern has been nominated to the boards of national or international public broadcasting organizations by Presidents George H. W. Bush, Bill Clinton and George W. Bush. She is also a board member of the Washington Institute for Near East Policy, a Washington D.C.-based foreign policy interest group, and of the International Republican Institute.

Additionally, President George W. Bush appointed Halpern to serve on the Honorary Delegation to accompany him to Jerusalem for the celebration of the 60th anniversary of the State of Israel in May 2008.

In December 2008, Halpern was nominated to be an alternate U.N. representative for the United States (Alternate representatives present U.S. views in a number of smaller forums, including at committee meetings and at ancillary U.N. bodies). She held this position until September 2009 when the U.N. General Assembly's 63rd session ended.

Halpern is a graduate of Barnard College and received her A.B. in 1975. She also received her MBA from New York University Stern School of Business in 1980.

Awards and nominations

References

External links
 Paul Farhi. Major GOP Donor Favored as Next CPB Chairman, Washington Post, July 15, 2005.

Corporation for Public Broadcasting
International Republican Institute
The Washington Institute for Near East Policy
Year of birth missing (living people)
Living people
New Jersey Republicans
Barnard College alumni
New York University Stern School of Business alumni